Thomas Blackborne Thoroton-Hildyard (8 April 1821 – 19 March 1888) was an English Conservative Party politician who sat in the House of Commons in two periods between 1846 and 1885.

Thoroton-Hildyard was the son of Colonel Thomas Blackborne Thoroton-Hildyard of Flintham Hall and his wife Anne Catherine White. His mother was heiress of Sir Robert D'Arcy Hildyard, and his father had assumed the surname Hildyard in addition to Thoroton in 1815 in connection with inheriting of the Hildyard family's estates based around Winestead Hall in the East Riding of Yorkshire. Thoroton-Hildyard was educated at Eton College and Christ Church, Oxford. He was a J.P. and Deputy Lieutenant for Nottinghamshire and a major in the South Nottinghamshire Yeomanry Cavalry.

In 1846 Thoroton-Hildyard was elected Member of Parliament for Nottinghamshire South. It was a toughly contested election. Hildyard was supported, according to the University of Nottingham, by the 4th Duke of Newcastle under Lyne "in spite of the fact that Newcastle’s son, the Earl of Lincoln, was his opponent. Lincoln attacked Hildyard’s youth and inexperience, but the 'young squire' still defeated him by a majority of almost 700." Thoroton-Hildyard held South Nottinghamshire from 1846 until 1852. In 1863 he was High Sheriff of Nottinghamshire. He was re-elected MP for South Nottinghamshire in 1866 and continued to represent the constituency until his retirement in 1885.

Thoroton-Hildyard died at the age of 66.

Thoroton-Hildyard married Anne Margaret Rochfort, daughter of Colonel Rochfort of Clogranane, County Carlow. He was the father of General Sir Henry Hildyard (1846–1916) and the grandfather of General Sir Reginald Hildyard (1876–1965). His brother was the cricketer and clergyman Henry Hildyard.

References

External links

1821 births
1888 deaths
Conservative Party (UK) MPs for English constituencies
UK MPs 1880–1885
UK MPs 1841–1847
UK MPs 1847–1852
UK MPs 1865–1868
UK MPs 1868–1874
UK MPs 1874–1880
People educated at Eton College
Alumni of Christ Church, Oxford
Deputy Lieutenants of Nottinghamshire
High Sheriffs of Nottinghamshire